Interleukin 10 receptor, alpha subunit is a subunit for the interleukin-10 receptor. IL10RA, is its human gene.

IL10RA has also recently been designated CDW210A (cluster of differentiation W210A).

Function 

The protein encoded by this gene is a receptor for interleukin 10. This protein is structurally related to interferon receptors. It has been shown to mediate the immunosuppressive signal of interleukin 10, and thus inhibits the synthesis of proinflammatory cytokines. This receptor is reported to promote survival of progenitor myeloid cells through the insulin receptor substrate-2/PI 3-kinase/AKT pathway. Activation of this receptor leads to tyrosine phosphorylation of JAK1 and TYK2 kinases.

Interactions 

Interleukin 10 receptor, alpha subunit has been shown to interact with:
 Interleukin 10  and
 Janus kinase 1.

References

Further reading

Clusters of differentiation
Type II cytokine receptors